Vice Principals is an American dark comedy television series starring Danny McBride, Walton Goggins, Kimberly Hébert Gregory, Dale Dickey, Georgia King, Sheaun McKinney, Busy Philipps and Shea Whigham. The co-creators were Danny McBride and Jody Hill. The series was ordered by HBO in May 2014 with an 18-episode pickup, and the series was split into two seasons for a designed finite run. The series began to shoot in 2015 and wrapped in mid-2016, and premiered on July 17, 2016. The second and final season premiered on September 17, 2017, and concluded on November 12, 2017.

Synopsis
Vice Principals focuses on ill-tempered, dogmatic, and disliked vice principal of North Jackson High School, Neal Gamby (Danny McBride), and his ambitions of being promoted to the principal's chair when the principal is due to step down. However, when the current principal (Bill Murray) retires, he reveals that he trusts neither Gamby nor his scheming and seemingly sociopathic co-vice principal Lee Russell (Walton Goggins), and so has recommended neither of them as his successor; instead, outsider Dr. Belinda Brown (Kimberly Hébert Gregory) is hired. When Gamby's attempt to get the school faculty to veto the appointment backfires (as Brown quickly makes a positive impression on the staff with her goal-oriented agenda and amicability with students), he conspires with Russell to find some way of ruining Brown's reputation and installing himself as principal. The show chronicles the schemers' gradual self-destruction as their own biases and unlikable personalities increasingly alienate Brown and the rest of their co-workers.

Cast

Main
Danny McBride as Neal Gamby, the divorced, self-important, authoritarian vice principal in charge of discipline at North Jackson High.
Walton Goggins as Lee Russell, vice principal of curriculum at North Jackson High, a conniving politician who enters into an unholy alliance with Gamby.
Kimberly Hébert Gregory as Dr. Belinda Brown, North Jackson High's "confident and powerful" school principal. (season 1, season 2 guest)
Georgia King as Amanda Snodgrass, the idealistic new English teacher at North Jackson High.
Sheaun McKinney as Dayshawn, a cafeteria worker who Gamby frequently confides in. 
Busy Philipps as Gale Liptrapp, Neal's ex-wife and Ray Liptrapp's new bride.
Shea Whigham as Ray Liptrapp, the new husband of Gamby's ex, and frequent target of his hostility — despite being a genuine and supportive guy.
Dale Dickey as Nash (season 2), the new Vice Principal then Principal of NJHS.

Recurring
Maya G. Love as Janelle Gamby, Neal and Gale's daughter, of whom Gale has primary custody.
Edi Patterson as Jen Abbott, a Spanish teacher at North Jackson High with a one-sided crush on Gamby. 
Ashley Spillers as Janice Swift, the new secretary for North Jackson High.
Susan Park as Christine Russell, Lee's wife.
June Kyoto Lu as Mi Cha, Lee's mother-in-law.
Mike O'Gorman as Bill Hayden, a history teacher at North Jackson High.
Madelyn Cline as Taylor Watts (season 1), Spirit Captain at North Jackson High.
James M. Connor as Martin Seychelles, a drama teacher at North Jackson High
Robin Bartlett as Octavia LeBlanc, an English teacher at North Jackson High
Brian Howe as Jeremy Haas (season 1), Superintendent of the school district.
RJ Cyler as Luke Brown, Brown's older son.
Jennifer Gatti as Mrs. Deets
Brian Tyree Henry as Dascious Brown (season 1), Belinda Brown's estranged husband.
Marcius Harris as Officer Terrence Willows (season 2), the school security guard.
Alexandra McVicker as Robin Shandrell (season 2), a delinquent student who Gamby expelled from North Jackson prior to the beginning of the series.
Fisher Stevens as Brian Biehn (season 2), Amanda's new boyfriend, a successful novelist and lecturer.
Christopher Thornton as Mr. Milner (season 2), a science teacher and amateur cartoonist at North Jackson.

Episodes

Season 1 (2016)

Season 2 (2017)

Production
On June 15, 2015, the Charleston City Paper reported Vice Principals filming in the North Charleston, South Carolina neighborhood of Park Circle. The newspaper added that comic actors Will Ferrell and Bill Murray would make cameo appearances in the series.  Scenes that take place in the school were shot on the campus of R. B. Stall High School and also filmed on campus of West Ashley High School.

Music
The score was composed by Joseph Stephens. The soundtrack was released by Waxwork Records in 2019 on a double LP pressed to 180 gram vinyl. The release included liner notes by McBride and Stephens.

Reception
Vice Principals received positive reviews from critics in season 1 and reviews for season 2 in general highly praised the show. On Rotten Tomatoes, season 1 has a rating of 64%, based on 39 reviews, with an average rating of 6.48/10. The site's critical consensus reads, "Vice Principals is sporadically amusing and benefits from its talented stars, but its mean-spirited humor sometimes misses the mark." On Metacritic, the season has a score of 56 out of 100, based on 31 critics, indicating "mixed or average reviews". Season 2 has a 100% rating on Rotten Tomatoes with an average rating of 7.0 out of 10 based on 10 reviews.

Accolades

Home media
The complete first season of Vice Principals was released on DVD and Blu-ray by HBO Home Entertainment (which is distributed through Warner Home Video) on February 7, 2017. The complete series was released on DVD by HBO Home Entertainment on April 10, 2018.

References

External links
 
MTV on Danny McBride and Vice Principals
USA Today on HBO Comedy and Vice Principals

2010s American high school television series
2010s American black comedy television series
2010s American single-camera sitcoms
2010s American workplace comedy television series
2016 American television series debuts
2017 American television series endings
English-language television shows
HBO original programming
Television shows set in South Carolina
Television series created by Danny McBride